Robert J. McNea (1929 – November 5, 2005) was a Canadian entertainer. He was known for three clown characters he portrayed on television, including Moppets the Clown (1950-1959), Bozo the Clown (1959-1966), and Oopsy the Clown (1967-1983). He died in 2005 in Kitchener, Ontario.

References

1929 births
2005 deaths
American clowns
Bozo the Clown